Argidae is a large family of sawflies, containing some 800 species worldwide, primarily in tropical regions. The larvae are phytophagous, and commonly can be found feeding (and often pupating) in groups, though very few attain pest status.

The family is distinguished from all other Symphyta by the reduction of the antenna to three segments, flagellomeres;  the last one is elongated often shaped like a tuning fork in males.

References

External links
 
 

 
Sawfly families
Taxa named by Friedrich Wilhelm Konow